Wat Hosian Voravihane is a Buddhist temple (wat) in Luang Prabang, Laos.

An active temple, the grounds include living quarters for the monks and a school building.

References

Buddhist temples in Laos
Buildings and structures in Luang Prabang